Leptogyra is a genus of sea snails, marine gastropod mollusks in the family Melanodrymiidae, belonging to the clade Neomphalina.

This genus was originally placed in Skeneidae, then in Skeneinae within Turbinidae.

Species
Species within the genus Leptogyra include:
 Leptogyra alaskana Bartsch, 1910
 Leptogyra bujnitzkii (Gorbunov, 1946)
 Leptogyra constricta B. A. Marshall, 1988 
 Leptogyra costellata Warén & Bouchet, 2009
 Leptogyra eritmeta Bush, 1897
 Leptogyra inconspicua Bush, 1897
 Leptogyra inflata Warén & Bouchet, 1993 
 Leptogyra patula B. A. Marshall, 1988 
 Leptogyra verrilli Bush, 1897
Species brought into synonymy
 Leptogyra africana Bartsch, 1915: synonym of Cirsonella africana (Bartsch, 1915) (original combination)

References

 Warén A. & Bouchet P. (1993) New records, species, genera, and a new family of gastropods from hydrothermal vents and hydrocarbon seeps. Zoologica Scripta 22: 1-90

External links
 Bush, K. (1897). Revision of the marine gastropods referred to Cyclostrema, Adeorbis, Vitrinella and related genera with descriptions of some new genera and species belonging to the Atlantic fauna of America. Transactions of the Connecticut Academy of Arts and Sciences. 10: 97-144

Melanodrymiidae